Julie Nichols (born April 21, 1978 in Walnut Creek, California) is an American rower. She competed in the lightweight double sculls at the 2012 Summer Olympics.

References 
 

1978 births
Living people
American female rowers
Rowers at the 2012 Summer Olympics
Olympic rowers of the United States
World Rowing Championships medalists for the United States
Pan American Games medalists in rowing
Pan American Games silver medalists for the United States
Rowers at the 2007 Pan American Games
Medalists at the 2007 Pan American Games
21st-century American women